The Third Field Army is a field army of the Egyptian Army, with its headquarters in Suez. It is now part of the Unified Command of the area east of the canal (Egypt).

On 31 January 2015 a "unified command" was established to oversee counterterrorism operations east of the Suez Canal. Osama Askar, commander of the Third Army, was promoted to lieutenant general and given command of the new "unified command." Askar will also retain his seat on the SCAF. Askar's former deputy, Muhammad Abdullah, has been appointed commander, and Tarek Anwar Helal the chief of staff, of the Third Army.

In May 2018 the Third Army comprised the 4th Armoured Division; the 19th Infantry Division, which included an armoured brigade, but whose remaining troops might have been un-mechanized infantry; the 23rd Mechanized Division; and the 11th Armoured Brigade. Previous 
army commander Osama Askar had previously commanded the 23rd Mechanized Division earlier in his career. The 23rd Division, under Brig Gen Ahmad 'Aboud el Zommer, was previously part of the Second Field Army during the Yom Kippur War.

Operation Badr order of battle, 1973
Just before the beginning of Operation Badr in October 1973, the army had the following troops under its control:
Headquarters Third Army (Southern Canal Zone) - Maj Gen Abdel Mun'im Wasel
Chief of Staff - Maj Gen Mustafa Shaheen
Chief of Artillery - Maj Gen Munir Shash
7th Infantry Division* - Brig Gen Ahmad Badawi Said Ahmad
2nd Infantry Brigade
11th Mechanized Infantry Brigade
8th Mechanized Infantry Brigade
19th Infantry Division* - Brig Gen Yusuf Afifi Mohamed
5th Infantry Brigade
7th Infantry Brigade
2nd Mechanized Infantry Brigade
4th Armoured Division - Brig Gen Mohamed Abd el Aziz Qabil
2nd Armored Brigade
3rd Armored Brigade*
6th Armored Brigade
6th Mechanised Division'' - Brig Gen Mohamed Abul Fath Muharam
22nd Armored Brigade*
113th Mechanised Brigade
1st Mechanised Brigade
130th Independent Amphibious Brigade - Col Mahmoud Shu'aib. At the start of the war the brigade had seventy-four BTR-50 or OT-64 SKOT armoured personnel carriers and 24 PT-76 amphibious light tanks.
25th Independent Armored Brigade* - Col Ahmed Helmy Badawy

As a brigadier general, Ahmed Badawi commanded the 7th Infantry Division during the Yom Kippur War, and after the Third Field Army became encircled, was placed in command of the cut-off force. The isolated part of the army was made up of the 7th and 19th Infantry Divisions, plus two independent armoured brigades, on the east bank, and a mixture of units in Suez city itself.

Notes

References and external links 

 https://search.wikileaks.org/plusd/cables/1976CAIRO16857_b.html - Third Army commander Maj Gen Ahmad Badawi speaks to State Department officials, 7 December 1976.

Field armies of Egypt
Military units and formations established in 1968
1968 establishments in Egypt